Nudd may refer to,
Bob Nudd
Gwyn ap Nudd
Lludd Llaw Eraint